Sharyn L. Ross is an American film editor who began her career working on 1982's Liquid Sky.

Selected filmography 

 Peel (2019)
 Stolen from Suburbia (2015)
 Shouting Secrets (2011)
 Clubland (1999)
 Benefit of the Doubt (1993)
 There Goes the Neighborhood (1992)
 Heart of the Deal (1990)
 Ernest Goes to Jail (1990)
 Ernest Saves Christmas (1988)
 Doin' Time on Planet Earth (1988)
 Under Cover (1987)
 Playing for Keeps (1986)
 A Stroke of Genius (1984)
 Sleepaway Camp (1983)
 Liquid Sky (1982)

References 

Living people
American women film editors
Year of birth missing (living people)
American film editors
21st-century American women